Gretchen Gotay Cordero (born August 14, 1980) is a Puerto Rican former swimmer, who specialized in freestyle and backstroke events. She won a total of four medals (2 golds and 2 bronze) in both freestyle and medley relays at the Central American and Caribbean Games (1998, 2002, and 2006). She is a member of Athens Bulldogs Swim Club under her personal coach Harvey Humphries, and a graduate with a master's degree in sports management at the University of Georgia in Athens.

Gotay qualified for the women's 200 m backstroke, as a member of the Puerto Rico team, at the 2004 Summer Olympics in Athens. She posted a meet-record and a FINA B-standard of 2:19.89 from the Caribbean Championships in Kingston, Jamaica. She participated in the first heat, against two other swimmers Saida Iskandarova of Uzbekistan, and Sherry Tsai of Hong Kong, who carried the nation's flag in the opening ceremony. She raced to second place by a 4.56-second margin behind winner Tsai, outside her entry time of 2:23.39. Gotay failed to advance into the semifinals, as she placed thirty-first overall in the preliminaries.

References

External links
Profile – Río Piedras Hall of Fame 

1980 births
Living people
Puerto Rican female swimmers
Olympic swimmers of Puerto Rico
Swimmers at the 1999 Pan American Games
Swimmers at the 2004 Summer Olympics
Puerto Rican female freestyle swimmers
Female backstroke swimmers
Sportspeople from San Juan, Puerto Rico
University of Georgia alumni
Central American and Caribbean Games gold medalists for Puerto Rico
Central American and Caribbean Games bronze medalists for Puerto Rico
Competitors at the 1998 Central American and Caribbean Games
Competitors at the 2002 Central American and Caribbean Games
Competitors at the 2006 Central American and Caribbean Games
Central American and Caribbean Games medalists in swimming
Pan American Games competitors for Puerto Rico